Derek Curtis Bok (born March 22, 1930) is an American lawyer and educator, and the former president of Harvard University.

Life and career
Bok was born in Bryn Mawr, Pennsylvania. Following his parents' divorce, he, his mother, brother and sister moved several times, ultimately to Los Angeles, where he spent much of his childhood. He graduated from Stanford University (B.A., 1951), Harvard Law School (J.D., 1954), attended Sciences Po, and George Washington University (A.M., 1958).

Bok taught law at Harvard beginning in 1958 and was selected dean of the law school there (1968–1971) after Dean Erwin Griswold was appointed Solicitor-General of the United States. He then served as the university's 25th president (1971–1991), succeeding Nathan M. Pusey. In the mid-1970s, Bok negotiated with Radcliffe College president Matina Horner the "non-merger merger" between Harvard and Radcliffe Colleges that was a major step in the final merger of the two institutions.  Bok recently served as the faculty chair at the Hauser Center for Nonprofit Organizations at Harvard, taught at the Harvard Graduate School of Education, and is the 300th Anniversary University Professor at Harvard Kennedy School.

Bok's focus on undergraduate education was evident in his initiating the Harvard Assessment Seminar that resulted in Richard J. Light's best-selling book, Making the Most of College: Students Speak Their Minds (Harvard University Press, 2001). This focus has continued in Bok's numerous publications since retiring as Harvard president. He was the recipient of the 2001 University of Louisville Grawemeyer Award in Education for his book, The Shape of the River: Long-Term Consequences of Considering Race in College and University Admissions, co-authored with the former President of Princeton University, William G. Bowen. The Derek Bok Center for Teaching and Learning at Harvard was created during Bok's Harvard presidency, reflecting Bok's concern for the quality of pedagogy employed at research universities like Harvard and its peers around the world. The Harvard Extension School instituted the Derek Bok Public Service Prizes, an annual Commencement prize for the Harvard Extension School students who involve in community service or who have a long-standing records of civic achievement.

Bok served as interim president of Harvard from Lawrence Summers's resignation on July 1, 2006, to the beginning of Drew Gilpin Faust presidency on July 1, 2007. Bok was a member of both the American Academy of Arts and Sciences and the American Philosophical Society.

Personal life
In 1955, Bok married Swedish sociologist and philosopher Sissela Bok (née Myrdal) (daughter of the Swedish economist Gunnar Myrdal and the politician and diplomat Alva Myrdal, both Nobel laureates), who received her doctorate from Harvard in 1970. His daughter, Hilary Bok, is a philosophy professor at Johns Hopkins University.

Bok is the son of Pennsylvania Supreme Court justice Curtis Bok and Margaret Plummer Bok; the grandson of Dutch-born Ladies' Home Journal editor Edward Bok and Mary Louise Curtis, founder of the Curtis Institute of Music; the cousin of prominent Maine folklorist Gordon Bok; and the great-grandson of Cyrus H. K. Curtis, founder of the Curtis Publishing Company, publisher of national magazines such as The Saturday Evening Post.

Bibliography

References

External links 
 Harvard Graduate School of Education
 Harvard Kennedy School Faculty Profile
  Association of American Colleges and Universities | National Leadership Council for Liberal Education
 Derek Bok Center for Teaching and Learning
 
 

Curtis family
George Washington University alumni
Presidents of Harvard University
Harvard Law School faculty
Harvard Law School alumni
Harvard Graduate School of Education faculty
Harvard Kennedy School faculty
Deans of Harvard Law School
1930 births
Living people
Stanford University alumni
People from Bryn Mawr, Pennsylvania
Center for Advanced Study in the Behavioral Sciences fellows
American people of Dutch descent
Writers from Pennsylvania
Members of the American Philosophical Society